Emer O'Farrell born 1981 in Cork is a camogie player and a marketing executive, winner of All Ireland camogie medals in 2008, and 2009 and a camogie All Star nominee in 2008. Cork's leading goalscorer in 2009 is the holder of All-Ireland Junior and Senior medals and also won National Junior and Senior League and provincial honours. Was a member of the Cork IT team that won the Purcell Cup in 2001. Holds Munster championship medals at Senior, Intermediate and Junior. Emer is Secretary of her club and very involved with their under-age section.

References

External links 
 Official Camogie Website
 Denise Cronin's championship diary in On The Ball Official Camogie Magazine
 Fixtures and results for the 2009 O'Duffy Cup
 All-Ireland Senior Camogie Championship: Roll of Honour
 Video highlights of 2009 championship Part One and part two
 Video Highlights of 2009 All Ireland Senior Final
 Report of All Ireland final in Irish Times Independent and Examiner

1981 births
Living people
Cork camogie players